Rodolfo Jesús Angeles Zuñiga (born 2 March 1999) is a Peruvian footballer who plays as a winger.

Club career

Deportivo Municipal
Angeles got his Peruvian Primera División debut for Deportivo Municipal on 9 August 2017 against Real Garcilaso at the age of 18. Angeles played from the first minute, before being replaced in the 68th minute. He played a total of two games in the 2017 for the first team, including his debut. In the 2018 season, he made zero appearances for the first team, playing for the club's reserve team.

In the 2019 season, he was still playing with the reserves. Therefore, he was loaned out to Peruvian Segunda División club Santos de Nasca in the summer 2019 for the rest of the year. He made 9 appearances for the club, before returning to Municipal, where he was a part of the reserve team again for the 2020 season.

References

External links
 
 

Living people
1999 births
Association football wingers
Peruvian footballers
Peruvian Segunda División players
Peruvian Primera División players
Deportivo Municipal footballers
Santos de Nasca players